Elizabeth C. Bunce is an American author who writes mysteries, fantasy, and ghost stories featuring strong female characters. Best known for her Edgar Award-winning Myrtle Hardcastle Mystery series and her novel A Curse Dark as Gold, her books are often inspired by folklore, and targeted toward young adult and pre-teen readers while also appealing to adults. Her writing style has been referred to as literary fiction, and her works have been called “mysteries in fantasy dress,” “spun with mystery and shot through with romance.” Her works are infused with the results of her research into history, science, culture, and etymology, often set in or inspired by historical places and times.

Career
Bunce's first novel A Curse Dark as Gold received the American Library Association’s inaugural William C. Morris Award, and was named a Smithsonian Notable Book. The first book in Bunce’s Myrtle Hardcastle Mystery series, Premeditated Myrtle, won the 2021 Edgar Award, was named a 2021 honoree by the Society of Midland Authors and it was an Agatha Award finalist and an Anthony Award finalist. In 2022 Bunce again was named a finalist for the Edgar Award, Agatha Award, and Anthony Award for the third book in her series, Cold-Blooded Myrtle, making Bunce one of only three authors with this distinction. With a nomination for the third consecutive year in 2023, for In Myrtle Peril, the fourth novel in her series, she became a three-time Agatha Award finalist. Cold-Blooded Myrtle was also a 2022 Silver Falchion Award Finalist.  Two of Bunce's novels have appeared on Oprah Winfrey's Kids’ Reading List, and four of Bunce's novels have been awarded Kansas Notable Book Awards.

A full-time writer since earning her degree in English and anthropology from the University of Iowa in 1996, Bunce has presented workshops on writing and storytelling techniques for both professional writers and kids, appeared as a panelist for her fans at San Diego Comic-Con, Planet Comicon, Bouchercon, Malice Domestic, the World Fantasy Convention, WisCon, and other pop culture conventions, and she was Guest of Honor at Archon 45. She has appeared as a panelist or presenter at numerous libraries and schools. Bunce has referred to herself as an avid “maker”—she is also a historical costumer, cosplayer, and needlewoman. She was the keynote speaker at Kansas City's inaugural event for the 36th annual World Doll Day. Bunce is a fan of Gothic fiction, ghost stories, mystery tropes, pop culture references, The Scarlet Pimpernel, Veronica Mars, and the works of Daphne Du Maurier, Sharon Shinn, and Charles Dickens. Bunce has said that in her youth she was a voracious reader and a fan of the Trixie Belden mystery novels.

Reception
Bunce has received favorable industry and literary reviews for her writing. Publishers Weekly referred to her Myrtle Hardcastle mystery series as “the best thing to happen to youth mysteries since Trixie Belden.”  The Wall Street Journal said “Younger Holmes fans (and older ones too) should be charmed by Elizabeth C. Bunce's Cold-Blooded Myrtle.”   The Buffalo News called Premeditated Myrtle a “hugely entertaining, well-crafted Victorian whodunnit.” The Kansas City Star called Premeditated Myrtle "loaded with energy that propels the reader forward in the tradition of all the most addictive of children’s books mysteries.”  Peter S. Beagle, author of The Last Unicorn, said "Elizabeth Bunce is the real thing, no question about it. A Curse Dark as Gold beats the hell out of any fantasy novel I’ve read this year. Her heroine/narrator is immensely appealing; the atmosphere of a world on the cusp of the Industrial Revolution is completely believable; and the suspense of the story builds so craftily that I started taking notes on just how she does it. Speaking as a writer, Elizabeth Bunce is definitely worth stealing from; speaking as a reader… all right, all right, already, I couldn’t put it down. She’s that good.”  Smithsonian Magazine called Bunce's A Curse Dark as Gold, “a spellbinding novel of romance and buried secrets.”

Works

Bunce is known for two series, both ongoing. The first is a high fantasy for young adults featuring a thief named Digger called the Thief Errant series, including the novels StarCrossed, (named a Chicago Public Library Best of the Best Book for 2010) and Liar's Moon. The series has been called a “political fantasy” and compared to the novels of George R.R. Martin. Her Myrtle Hardcastle Mystery series features a 12-year-old aspiring detective named Myrtle Hardcastle, who solves crimes with her governess Ada Judson and a cat named Peony, set in 1890s Victorian England. Bunce's young sleuth has been compared to Enola Holmes, Flavia de Luce, and Harriet the Spy. The series is being published internationally in German and Russian translations.

Standalone Novels
 A Curse Dark as Gold (2008), Arthur A. Levine Books/Scholastic

Thief Errant series
 StarCrossed (2010), Arthur A. Levine Books/Scholastic
 Liar’s Moon (2011), Arthur A. Levine Books/Scholastic

Myrtle Hardcastle Mystery series
 Premeditated Myrtle (2020), Algonquin Young Readers/Workman Publishing
 How to Get Away with Myrtle (2020), Algonquin Young Readers/Workman Publishing
 Cold-Blooded Myrtle (2021), Algonquin Young Readers/Workman Publishing
 In Myrtle Peril (2022), Algonquin Young Readers/Workman Publishing/Hachette Book Group
 Myrtle, Means, and Opportunity (coming 2023), Algonquin Young Readers/Workman Publishing/Hachette Book Group

References

External links

 Official website
 Elizabeth C. Bunce at Algonquin Young Readers Publisher Page

Living people
American children's writers
American fantasy writers
American women novelists
Women science fiction and fantasy writers
21st-century American novelists
21st-century American women writers
American women children's writers
Women writers of young adult literature
Novelists from Iowa
Novelists from Kansas
Year of birth missing (living people)
The William C. Morris YA Debut Award winners